Earl is an unincorporated community located in the town of Springbrook, Washburn County, Wisconsin, United States.

History
When the community was founded, it was named Sinclair's Spur. H. L. Sinclair was the agent for the Chicago, St. Paul, Minneapolis and Omaha Railroad's agent in Trego, Wisconsin. Earl's post office opened on August 30, 1905, and closed on July 1, 1984. The community was named for Earl McDill, a relative of the first postmaster, John Whitney.

References

Unincorporated communities in Washburn County, Wisconsin
Unincorporated communities in Wisconsin